Castel del Monte may refer to:
Castel del Monte, Abruzzo, a comune and town in the Province of L'Aquila, Italy
Castel del Monte, Apulia, a 13th-century castle and World Heritage Site in southern Italy
 Castel del Monte, a wine Denominazione di origine controllata of the Italian province of Barletta-Andria-Trani in Apulia, see List of Italian DOC wines#Apulia